Milltown, also known as Graggs Mill or Woodville, is an unincorporated community in Chambers County, Alabama, United States.

History
Milltown was originally called Graggs Mill after the gristmill operated there by William Graggs. The name was then changed to Woodville, but that was soon changed to Milltown, since a Woodville already existed in Alabama. A post office operated under the name Milltown from 1848 to 1955.

References

Unincorporated communities in Chambers County, Alabama
Unincorporated communities in Alabama